The Theme of Seleucia (thema Seleukeias) was a Byzantine theme (a military-civilian province) in the southern coast of Asia Minor (modern Turkey), headquartered at Seleucia (modern Silifke).

History
In Late Antiquity, the port of Seleucia was the chief city of the Roman province of Isauria and seat of the comes Isauriae. In the 8th century, it is attested as a subordinate command, first under a tourmarches and then under a droungarios, of the naval theme of the Cibyrrhaeots. In the early 9th century, however, it appears as a small kleisoura (a fortified frontier command) sandwiched between the larger Byzantine themes of the Cibyrrhaeots, the Anatolics, and Cappadocia and the sea, and bordering on the Abbasid Caliphate's domains in Cilicia along the river Lamos. According to the Arab geographers Qudamah ibn Ja'far and Ibn Khordadbeh, in the 9th century the kleisoura comprised Seleucia as capital and ten other fortresses, with 5,000 men, out of which 500 were cavalry.

The kleisoura was raised to the status of a full theme sometime in the reign of Romanos I Lekapenos (r. 920–944), most likely c. 927–934. According to the De Thematibus of Emperor Constantine VII (r. 913–959), the theme was divided in two commands, one for the hinterland and a coastal/maritime one.

The region fell into the hands of the Seljuk Turks after the Battle of Manzikert in 1071. At the time, the mountainous interior of the region was predominantly inhabited by Armenians who had settled there over the previous century. The Byzantines recovered the area and refortified Seleucia and Corycus in 1099/1100, after which it became anew the seat of a Byzantine military governor (doux). It remained a Byzantine province until shortly after 1180, when it was conquered by the Armenian Kingdom of Cilicia.

References

Sources

Themes of the Byzantine Empire
States and territories established in the 10th century
Byzantine Anatolia